Dhaka is the most populous city of Bangladesh and is characterized by its busy urban life with vibrant and versatile culture including many festivities, variety of cuisine, entertainment industry, shopping experience and sites of interests.

Festivals

Dhaka's annual cultural events, festivals and celebrations are Independence Day (26 March), the International Mother language Day (21 February), Victory Day, Pohela Boishakh, Ekushey Book Fair, Dhaka Art Summit, Rabindra Joyonti and Nazrul Joyonti; the Hindu festivals including the Durga Puja, Janmashtami and Rathayatra; the Muslim festivals of Eid ul-Fitr, Eid ul-Adha, Milad-un-Nabi, Shab-e-Baraat and Muharram; Buddhist festival of Buddha Purnima and Christian festival of Christmas. Dhaka's people congregate at the Shaheed Minar and the Jatiyo Sriti Soudho to remember the national heroes of the Bengali Language Movement and the Bangladesh Liberation War. Much art and museums congregate artifacts and remember solemnly the war crimes inflicted by Pakistani war criminals and their collaborators who committed crimes against the people. These occasions are observed with public ceremonies and rallies on public grounds. Many schools and colleges organise fairs, festivals and concerts in which citizens from all levels of society participate. Pôhela Boishakh is the first day of the Bengali calendar. It is usually celebrated on 14 April. Pohela Boishakh first marks the start day of the crop bringing home season. Usually on Pôhela Boishakh, the home is thoroughly scrubbed and cleaned; people wash early in the morning sunshine and dress in fine clothes. They spend much of the day visiting relatives, friends, and neighbours and going to the fair. Fairs are arranged in many parts of the country where various agricultural products, traditional handicrafts, toys, cosmetics, as well as various kinds of food and sweets are sold. The fairs also provide entertainment, with singers, dancers and traditional plays and songs. Horse races, bull races, bullfights, cockfights, flying pigeons, and boat racing were once popular. Also a statue erected where massacre of Bengalis protecting language movement was done

Pohela Boishakh, the Bengali New Year, falls annually on 14 April and is popularly celebrated across the city. Large crowds of people gather on the streets of Shahbag, Ramna Park and the campus of the University of Dhaka for celebrations.

Other festivities include, Bengali Spring Festival, Nazrul Joyonti, Birthday of Kazi Nazrul Islam, Rabindra Jayanti, Birthday of Rabindranath Tagore, Hay Festival Dhaka, Bengal-ITC SRA Classical Music Festival.

Performing arts and media

Despite the growing popularity of music groups and rock bands, traditional folk music remains widely popular. The works of the national poet Kazi Nazrul Islam and national anthem writer Rabindranath Tagore have a widespread following across Dhaka. The Baily Road area is known as Natok Para (Theater Neighborhood) which is the center of Dhaka's thriving theater movement.

Bangladesh Betar is the state-run primary provider of radio services, and broadcasts a variety of programs in Bengali and English. In recent years many private radio networks, especially FM radio services, have been established in the city such as Radio Foorti FM 88.0, Radio Today FM 89.6, Radio Amar FM 88.4, ABC Radio FM 89.2, DHAKA FM 90.4 etc. Bangladesh Television is the state-run broadcasting network that provides a wide variety of programs in Bengali and English since 25 December 1964. It has two TV channels- BTV and BTV world. The first one telecasts via terrestrial and satellite networks while the later telecasts via satellite only. Shongshod Bangladesh Television is another state-run TV channel which was launched on 25 January 2011 and broadcasts the parliamentary activities of Bangladesh. Cable and satellite TV networks such as Ekushey Television, Channel I, ATN Bangla, Desh TV, RTV, NTV, Banglavision, Channel 9 Bangladesh and Independent TV are amongst the most popular channels. The main offices of most publishing houses in Bangladesh are based in Dhaka. The Prothom Alo and The Daily Ittefaq are the most popular amongst the large number of Bengali language dailies, periodicals and other publications in the city. The Daily Star and The Independent are among the English dailies published. Fixed-line teledensity in Bangladesh is less than 1%. Mobile penetration is 82 telephone subscriptions per 100 inhabitants.

Dhaka is home to Dhaka Art Summit, Dhaka World Music Festival.

Media and cinema

Dhaka is the center of media and cinema of Bangladesh. The Bangladeshi press is diverse, outspoken and privately owned. Over 200 newspapers are published in the country. Bangladesh Betar is the state-run radio service. The British Broadcasting Corporation operates the popular BBC Bangla news and current affairs service. Bengali broadcasts from Voice of America are also very popular. Bangladesh Television (BTV) is the state-owned television network. There more than 20 privately owned television networks, including several news channels. Freedom of the media remains a major concern, due to government attempts at censorship and harassment of journalists.

The cinema of Bangladesh dates back to 1898, when films began screening at the Crown Theatre in Dacca. The first bioscope in the subcontinent was established in Dacca that year. The Dhaka Nawab Family patronised the production of several silent films in the 1920s and 30s. In 1931, the East Bengal Cinematograph Society released the first full-length feature film in Bangladesh, titled the Last Kiss. The first feature film in East Pakistan, Mukh O Mukhosh, was released in 1956. During the 1960s, 25–30 films were produced annually in Dacca. By the 2000s, Bangladesh produced 80–100 films a year. While the Bangladeshi film industry has achieved limited commercial success; the country has produced notable independent film makers. Zahir Raihan was a prominent documentary-maker who was assassinated in 1971. The late Tareque Masud is regarded as one of Bangladesh's outstanding directors due to his numerous productions on historical and social issues. Masud was honoured by FIPRESCI at the Cannes Film Festival in 2002 for his film The Clay Bird. Tanvir Mokammel, Mostofa Sarwar Farooki, Humayun Ahmed, Alamgir Kabir and Chashi Nazrul Islam are other prominent directors of Bangladesh cinema.

Cuisine

A rich culinary tradition has developed in Dhaka. Everyday meals consumed at home generally include plain rice as staple with fish, meat, vegetable curries as side. Dal (Lentil soup) is common accompaniment. Plain rice is often replaced by roti or porota. However, culinary experience in most restaurants take a different direction. Kachchi biryani, chicken biryani, tehari, polao, khichuri are most common courses in restaurants. For snacks, Mughlai porota, halim, shingara, samosa, etc. are common. Borhani, lacchhi are amongst popular drinks. Street carts in parks offer snacks like chotpoti, jhalmuri and fuchka.

Some restaurants are famous for their specialised recipes and culinary experience. These include, Nannar Biryani, Haji Biryani, Mutton Glassey, Laban etc. found in Old Dhaka. Chawk bazar, Thatari Bazar etc. are places of many popular eateries. Chaap found in Mohammadpur and Dhanmondi are popular delicacies. Other specialties of city's culinary experience include, jali kabab, reshmi kabab, shuti kabab, shik kabab, gurda kabab, khiri kabab, reshmi jilapi, shahi jilapi, rumali ruti, tandoor ruti, naan, bakorkhani, ilish polao, morog polao etc.

People of the city devour versatile culinary experience. Along with these Bangladeshi cuisine and South Asian variants, a large variety of international cuisine is available in Dhaka. There are restaurants specializing in Chinese, Thai, Japanese, Mexican, Italian, and other western cuisines. Local and international fast food shops and chains serve burgers, fries and other readily available foods. Often many restaurants customize foreign cuisine to meet the taste of local people. For instance, most Chinese restaurants in Dhaka use recipes different from authentic Chinese food.

The following international foreign-owned restaurant chains are currently operating in the country.

· A&W
· Baba Rafi
· Barista Lavazza
· Baskin Robbins
· bbq
· Burger King
· Butler's Chocolate Cafe
· Chatime
· Ci Gusta!
· Coffee World
· Cold Stone Creamery
· Cookie Man
· Cream & Fudge Factory
· Crimson Cup Coffee & Tea
· Dipsydo's
· Fish & Co
· Gloria Jean's Coffee
· Johnny Rocket's
· Kenny Rogers Roasters
· KFC
· Krispy Kreme
· Mainland China
· Manhattan Fish Market
· Movenpick
· Nando's
· New Zealand Natural
· Papparoti
· Pizza Hut 
· Pizza Inn
· Pizza Roma
· Sbarro
· Second Cup Coffee
· Sigree
· Suzuki Coffee
· The Coffee Bean & Tea Leaf
· The Great Kabab Factory
· Yo Berries

Shopping

Shopping in Dhaka is very easy. There are markets in almost every part of Dhaka, where household commodities are available. Shopping malls are also found in every major avenues; some of them are Dhaka New Market, Basundhara City, Jamuna Future Park, Shimanto Square, Rapa plaza, Metro Shopping mall, Concord Twin Tower, BCS Computer City, Navana Tower, Pink city shopping mall, Mouchak Market, Eastern Plaza, Fortune mall, Eastern plus, Banga Bazar, Razdhani market, Gausia complex, Holland Centre, Suvastu Nazar Valley, Cofidence Tower, Mollah tower, Lutfun tower, Eastern Mallika, Muskut plaza, North Tower, Razlaksmi complex, Multiplan Center and many more. Kudrat-E-Khuda Avenue (former New Elephant Road), and its surrounding areas are very popular destination for shoppers. Jamuna Future Park is the 12th largest shopping mall in the world with a gross leasable area of 4.1 million sq ft and total area of 5.45 million sq ft.

Chain stores like Shopno, Agora, Meena Bazar, Nondon, PQS are also found in most of the residential areas of the city. There are many branches of Aarong around the city where local products including clothing, handicrafts, groceries and home decors are available in a wide range.

Bangla Bazar is the largest hawkers market in Dhaka. The market is situated near Chankharpul behind the campus of the University of Dhaka. This place is famous for years for garment's cloths in a reasonable price. It is a favorite shopping place for many foreigners visiting Bangladesh. Basundhara City is the second largest mall in the country and has more than 23 hundred shops and 21 stories.

Dress

The most popular dressing styles for women are shari or shælwar kamij, while men usually prefer western clothing to the traditional lungi. This area is credited for the revival of the jamdani shari due to the many local shari stores selling and promoting these locally hand-made traditional Bengali sharis of fine patterned muslin. Jamdanis are 100% hand woven and originate from the Mughal era. Jamdanis are produced by a traditional high quality cottage industry, which is slowly dying out due to the slow production process. A single medium-range Jamdani shari may take as long as 3 months to complete.

Heritage

The Old City of Dhaka is home to over 2000 buildings built between the 16th and 19th centuries, which form an integral part of Dhaka's cultural heritage.
 Lalbagh Fort
 Ahsan Manzil
 Dhakeshwari Temple
 Shankhari Bazaar
 Swami Bagh Temple
 Ramna Kali Mandir
 Dhaka Sadarghat
 Armanitola, Armenian quarter
 Farashganj, French quarter

Academies

 Bangla Academy
 Asiatic Society of Bangladesh
 Faculty of Fine Arts
 National Performing Arts Academy
 Pathshala
 Islamic Foundation of Bangladesh
 Bishwo Shahitto Kendro (World Literature Center)

Museums and art galleries
 Bangladesh National Museum
 Liberation War Museum
 Drik Picture Library
 Ahsan Manzil
 Bangabandhu Memorial Museum

Major parks, lakes and gardens

 Ramna Park
 Suhrawardy Uddan
 Chandrima Uddan
 Baldha Garden
 Dhaka Zoo
 National Botanical Garden of Bangladesh

Religious and Cultural Festival
 Eid al-Fitr
 Eid al-Adha
 Muharram
 Shab-e-Barat
 Durga Puja
 Krishna Janmastami
 Diwali or Kali Puja
 Ratha-Yatra
 Shakrain
 Holi
 Bengali New Year
 Bohonto Utshob Bengali Spring Festival
 Nazrul Joyonti, Birthday of Kazi Nazrul Islam
 Rabindra Joyonti, Birthday of Rabindranath Tagore
 Ekushey Book Fair
 Hay Festival Dhaka
 Bengal-ITC SRA Classical Music Festival
 Dhaka Art Summit
 Dhaka World Music Festival

Official religious holidays
 Eid al-Fitr
 Eid al-Adha
 Muharram
 Mawlid
 Shab-e-Barat
 Durga Puja
 Krishna Janmastami
 Buddha Purnima
 Christmas

See also
 Culture of Bangladesh

References

Culture in Dhaka
Society of Bangladesh
Bangladeshi culture